André Geraldes de Barros (born 2 May 1991) is a Portuguese professional footballer who plays as a right back for Israeli club Maccabi Tel Aviv.

Club career
Born in Maia, Porto District, Geraldes spent most of his youth career with hometown club F.C. Maia, apart from one year with FC Porto in his early teenage years. He made his senior debut with the former in the fourth division in 2009.

A year later, Geraldes signed for Rio Ave F.C. but never played in their first team, instead being loaned out to G.D. Chaves (third tier) and C.D. Aves (second). In 2012, he joined İstanbul Başakşehir F.K. of the Turkish Süper Lig under compatriot Carlos Carvalhal.

After a loan to C.F. Os Belenenses in the first half of the year, Geraldes moved to another Lisbon-based club, Sporting CP, on a five-year deal in June 2014. Mainly assigned to the reserves, he was loaned back to Belenenses in July 2015, and Vitória F.C. a year later, both in the top flight and the latter alongside fellow Lion Ryan Gauld.

Both Geraldes and the Scotsman returned to Sporting at the start of 2017. In August that year, the former made a now familiar move, joining Belenenses on loan for the third time.

In July 2018, Geraldes went back abroad on a one-year loan to Sporting de Gijón in Spain's Segunda División. The Asturians could not pay the fixed fee of €1 million to make the deal permanent, so he went on yet another temporary switch to Maccabi Tel Aviv F.C. of the Israeli Premier League. He won the league title during his season in the Middle East.

Geraldes left Sporting permanently on 8 September 2020, on a two-year deal at APOEL FC in the Cypriot First Division. However, the following 12 January he returned to Maccabi on a contract running until June 2022.

Honours
Maccabi Tel Aviv 
Israeli Premier League: 2019–20
Israel Super Cup: 2020

References

External links

1991 births
Living people
People from Maia, Portugal
Sportspeople from Porto District
Portuguese footballers
Association football defenders
Primeira Liga players
Liga Portugal 2 players
Segunda Divisão players
F.C. Maia players
Rio Ave F.C. players
C.D. Aves players
Sporting CP B players
Sporting CP footballers
C.F. Os Belenenses players
Vitória F.C. players
Süper Lig players
İstanbul Başakşehir F.K. players
Segunda División players
Sporting de Gijón players
Israeli Premier League players
Maccabi Tel Aviv F.C. players
Cypriot First Division players
APOEL FC players
Portuguese expatriate footballers
Expatriate footballers in Turkey
Expatriate footballers in Spain
Expatriate footballers in Israel
Expatriate footballers in Cyprus
Portuguese expatriate sportspeople in Turkey
Portuguese expatriate sportspeople in Spain
Portuguese expatriate sportspeople in Israel
Portuguese expatriate sportspeople in Cyprus